The Lima Lima Flight Team is a precision formation flying demonstration team based in Naperville, Illinois.

The name derives from the FAA identifier of the field where the team originated. Naper Aero Club (LL-10) is located in the western suburbs of Chicago. It is an airport community, with 100 homes connected to its two runways via taxiways behind the homes. The original flying club (Mentor Flyers, Inc.) which spawned the Lima Lima team is still based at LL-10, but the founding members who lived there have since moved on, and the team is now a truly national team, with members in Illinois, Ohio, California, and Florida.

The Lima Lima Flight Team flies the Beechcraft T-34 Mentor. The Lima Lima Flight Team flies a civilianized and much-improved version of the original Mentor, with modern avionics and more powerful engines.

The military recognizes different levels of formation skills, from basic tactical formation flying to the air show performances of the Blue Angels and Thunderbirds. Lima Lima has evolved in the same way. Charter members of the team were at the forefront of the civilian formation certification program instituted by the T-34 Association in 1983, and eventually adopted by all civilian warbird organizations. The skills developed in this program have been expanded to include a series of formation maneuvers which mirror those of the jet teams.

The Lima Lima Flight Team demonstration showcases the full range of the T-34 performance envelope. Though the T-34 is much slower than the jets flown by military teams, the turn rates are over double those of the F-16 and F/A-18. The result is a performance which has no “dead time”. There is smoke and action in front of spectators for the entire 20 minute demonstration.

The Lima Lima Flight Team celebrates its 19th year of professional air show performances in 2006. In that time, the team has traveled from coast-to-coast and border-to-border and beyond, performing in Alaska, Mexico, and the Dominican Republic. The 2006 team is made up of professional airline pilots, retired military pilots, medical professionals, and successful businessmen. This eclectic mix of personnel provides a unique team personality.

External links
Lima Lima Flight Team

American aerobatic teams